Harold Iremonger (1894–1957) was an English professional footballer who played as a goalkeeper in the Football League for Nottingham Forest.

Personal life 
Iremonger's older brothers James and Albert were also sportsmen. He served as a private in the Football Battalion and the Royal Air Force during the First World War.

Career statistics

References

English footballers
English Football League players
Association football goalkeepers
British Army personnel of World War I
Middlesex Regiment soldiers
Nottingham Forest F.C. players
1894 births
1957 deaths
Footballers from Nottingham
Royal Air Force personnel of World War I
Royal Air Force airmen
Military personnel from Nottingham